Suzerain is a turn-based strategy video game developed by Torpor Games and published by Fellow Traveller. It was released for Microsoft Windows, MacOS and Nintendo Switch on 4 December 2020. It takes place in Sordland, a nation similar to Turkey.

Plot

History of the country 
Suzerain follows the fictitious country of the Republic of Sordland, which emerged from a civil war and a twenty-year conservative dictatorship, and Anton Rayne, who is elected as its new President in 1953, must decide how to lead the country in his first term and work to fix the various structural problems and crises that have affected the country for years, and navigate an increasingly tense geopolitical world to win a second term. The player must make various policy decisions at critical moments and during meetings, and prevent the nation from disintegrating or being invaded by one of the local powers on the continent of Merkopa. 30 years before his entry into the Presidency of Sordland, a republican uprising and popular revolution brought down the former absolute monarchy of the nation, with Artor S. Wisci, a prominent left-wing leader of the republican revolutionaries, becoming the first democratically elected President of Sordland, who then proceeded to implement various socialist economic and political reforms in an attempt to modernize Sordland into a parliamentary democracy, only for his government to be deposed in a far-right military coup, led by General Eduard Luderin, who blamed Wisci for "bringing foreign ideologies and chaos into Sordland", and then proceeded to violently dismantle Sordland's democratic institutions. A civil war followed after Luderin ordered a mass execution of thousands of suspected communists and pro-democratic dissidents in an attempt to consolidate his regime, leading to an uprising led by General Iannick Rikard, who also sympathized with several left-wing organizations such as the Red Youth, and actively armed and trained them in his offensives against Luderin's regime, seizing control of several major cities and regions.

Geopolitical situation 
As the situation in Sordland gradually grew more and more unstable and civilian casualties mounted, Colonel Tarquin Soll, who had previously been neutral in the conflict and refused to support either of the combatants, decided to intervene in the civil war as a third party, defeating the forces of both Rikard and Luderin, ending the civil war after 2 years of devastating warfare and re-established an ostensible democracy in Sordland, led by a centralized dominant-party regime under the rule of the United Sordland Party. The government of Tarquin Soll increasingly grew more authoritarian as the years passed, particularly after a violent massacre of anti-government protesters in the village of Izzam, populated largely by an ethnic minority known as the Bludish people, who opposed an attempt by the government to establish a dam that would forcibly displace them, causing the outbreak of a separatist insurgency in tandem with growing popular discontent, particularly after the economy began to stagnate due to governmental corruption, inefficiency, and chronic neglect of underdeveloped regions. By the 1940s, Tarquin Soll was narrowly defeated by Ewald Alphonso after the latter launched a leadership challenge against the government due to its inability to restore stability and public trust, and while Alphonso initially governed as a moderate political reformist and liberalizer, his rapid free-market reforms and programme of mass privatization triggered a severe economic crisis and collapse, forcing his entire cabinet to resign and causing him to be replaced by a relatively unknown politician called Anton Rayne as the new leader of the USP, who is then elected as the new President of Sordland in 1953, with the outcome of his presidency being determined by the player. The player guides the country through an economic and political crisis, and may choose to resolve the crisis by either pursuing a socialist planned economy that nationalizes large sections of Sordish industry, a mixed market economy, or continuing the Alphonso-era policy of laissez-faire capitalism.  Other interactions include reforming and expanding national education, healthcare, and other social welfare services, removing political corruption and inefficiency from Sordland's governing institutions and law enforcement, and preparing the military for a possible conflict with Rumburg, an expansionist and militarist monarchist empire to Sordland's north. As a consequence of the player's possible failure, the country can suffer nationwide protests, economic depression, a military coup d'etat, or an outright civil war, and the player must also deal with internal factionalism within the ruling United Sordland Party as they push to either reform the Constitution against the wishes of the retired President Soll and his loyalist associates for the benefit of democracy or themselves, or declare a nationwide state of emergency in an attempt to preserve the doctrine of Tarquin Soll.

Reception 

Suzerain was awarded the Deutscher Computerspielpreis Bestes Expertenspiel (Best Expert Game), as well as  the 2021 Games for Change People's Choice Award and was recognized as a Most Innovative Nominee. Unfold Games Awards also awarded the game with a honorable mention.

References

External links 

 Official website

2020 video games
Indie video games
Turn-based strategy video games
Single-player video games
Video games developed in Germany
Video games set in the 1950s
Video games set in 1954
Video games with Steam Workshop support
Nintendo Switch games
Windows games
Macintosh games
Fellow Traveller games